Ann Charlotte Bartholomew (1800–1862), was an English flower and miniature painter, and author.

Life

Bartholomew was born on 20 March 1800 in Loddon, Norfolk,   the daughter of Arnall Fayermann and niece of John Thomas, bishop of Rochester. In 1827 she married the composer Walter Turnbull who died in 1838.

In 1840 she published Songs of Azrael and other poems under the name of Mrs. Turnbull. In the same year she became the second wife of the flower painter, Valentine Bartholomew. After this, she began painting still-life fruits and flowers.  She exhibited at the British Institution and the  Royal Academy.  and the Society of British Artists. She was a founding member of the Society of Female Artists, after petitioning the Royal Academy to open its schools to women. The British Museum has one watercolour of this kind, "Study of a Garden Poppy"  But her main employment was miniatures for brooches and jewellery.

Her play The Ring, or the Farmer's Daughter, a domestic drama in two acts, appeared in 1845, and another, a farce called  It's Only My Aunt was first performed at the Marylebone Theatre in 1849. Both of these are widely available in microform as part of the English and American Drama of the 19th Century series.

She occasionally exhibited flower or fruit pieces, and showed at the Royal Academy. The British Museum has one watercolour of this kind, but her main employment was miniatures for brooches and jewellery.

She last exhibited in 1857, and died on 18 August 1862. She is buried with Valentine Bartholomew on the western side of Highgate Cemetery. The grave (plot no.11876) is immediately to the right of the north gatekeeper's lodge.

See also
English women painters from the early 19th century who exhibited at the Royal Academy of Art

 Sophie Gengembre Anderson
 Mary Baker
 Maria Bell
 Barbara Bodichon
 Joanna Mary Boyce
 Margaret Sarah Carpenter
 Fanny Corbaux
 Rosa Corder
 Mary Ellen Edwards
 Harriet Gouldsmith
 Mary Harrison (artist)
 Jane Benham Hay
 Anna Mary Howitt
 Mary Moser
 Martha Darley Mutrie
 Ann Mary Newton
 Emily Mary Osborn
 Kate Perugini
 Louise Rayner
 Ellen Sharples
 Rolinda Sharples
 Rebecca Solomon
 Elizabeth Emma Soyer
 Isabelle de Steiger
 Henrietta Ward

References

1862 deaths
19th-century English writers
19th-century English women writers
People from Loddon
19th-century English painters
English women painters
19th-century British women artists
1800 births
Burials at Highgate Cemetery